Saazish is a 1988 Indian Hindi-language film directed by Rajkumar Kohli, starring Raaj Kumar, Mithun Chakraborty, Raj Babbar, Dimple Kapadia, Anita Raj, Vinod Mehra, Kader Khan and Amrish Puri.

Plot
In this convoluted plot, Diwan (Amrish Puri), Dr. Kalidas (Kader Khan) and another secret person run a crime syndicate. They take insurance policies with fake identities and then fake their own deaths and claim insurance. Prem Krishan, a crime reporter, unearths this nefarious plan but is killed by Diwan. Prem Krishan's step brother Kailash is implicated in Prem Krishan's murder. Anand (Mithun Chakraborty) is in search of his sister who married her lover without informing him, and has gone missing thereafter. When Anand finally finds her, she is in a mental asylum, her husband is reported dead and Anand's friend Prakash (Raj Babbar) finds evidence which proves that Kailash (Raaj Kumar) is again responsible for her husband's murder. As if his troubles are not enough, Kailash's step sister and Anand's girl friend Meena (Dimple Kapadia) also has a low opinion of Kailash. Chased by cops and Anand, Kailash fakes his own death, but returns to town with a fake identity. After a series of badly scripted events, Kailash proves his innocence, Prakash turns out to be the secret third villain (who cheated Anand's sister) and all the bad guys are caught by police. Poor Anand does not get to protect his sister from villains, but no problem, the police inspector Saxena (Vinod Mehra) saves her.

Cast
Raaj Kumar as Kailash 
Mithun Chakraborty as Anand Kumar
Raj Babbar as  Prakash  
Dimple Kapadia as Meena 
Anita Raj as Roma  
Vinod Mehra as Inspector Saxena  
Jagdeep as 009 
Kader Khan as Dr. Kalidas 
Amrish Puri as Diwan  
Tej Sapru as Lobo 
Bob Christo
Jagdish Raj

Music

References

External links
 
 http://ibosnetwork.com/asp/filmbodetails.asp?id=Saazish+(1988)

1988 films
1980s Hindi-language films
Indian action films
Films scored by Kalyanji Anandji
1988 action films
Hindi-language action films